Ham, London could mean:

Ham, London in the London Borough of Richmond upon Thames
East Ham  or West Ham in the London Borough of Newham

See also
Ham Island